Giv'at Ye'arim (lit. Hill of Forests) is a semi-cooperative moshav in central Israel. Located in the Judean Mountains, it falls under the jurisdiction of Mateh Yehuda Regional Council.

History
The moshav was founded in 1950 by Yemenite immigrants, on the land of the depopulated Palestinian village of Khirbat al-'Umur.

Giv'at Ye'arim is assumed to be the site of Gibeath, a city mentioned in the Book of Joshua (18:28).

In the past, the majority of Giv'at Ye'arim residents worked in agriculture, particularly viticulture and poultry-breeding. Today, many hold jobs outside the moshav, mainly in Jerusalem and Mevaseret Zion.

References

External links
Official site of Giv'at Ye'arim

Moshavim
Populated places established in 1950
Populated places in Jerusalem District
1950 establishments in Israel
Yemeni-Jewish culture in Israel